Dalcha Lungiambula (born July 31, 1987) is a Congolese mixed martial artist and kickboxer who competed in the Middleweight division of the Ultimate Fighting Championship.

Mixed martial arts career

Early career

Lungiambula was born in Kinshasa, Democratic Republic of the Congo. When Lungiambula was eight-years-old, his father brought him his first judo uniform. Since that time, Lungiambula had practiced judo,  eventually earning a black belt. He represented the Congolese National Judo Team from 2007 to 2009, before switching to MMA in 2010. Following the switch, he moved to Table View where he fought in the Extreme Fighting Championship (EFC). In August 2016, Lungiambula became a winner of the EFC light heavyweight title, and the same year competed at the World Jiu-Jitsu Championship and ADCC Submission Wrestling World Championship. In June 2018, he was a winner of the EFC heavyweight title. He signed a contract with the UFC in December 2018.

Ultimate Fighting Championship

After regional domination in South Africa, Lungiambula made his UFC debut June 29, 2019 at UFC on ESPN: Ngannou vs. dos Santos against Dequan Townsend. He won the fight via TKO in the 3rd round.

Lungiambula faced Magomed Ankalaev on November 9, 2019 at UFC on ESPN+ 21. He lost the fight via knockout in the third round.

Lungiambula was expected to face Karl Roberson on December 12, 2020 at UFC 256 However, Karl tested positive for COVID-19 and the fight was moved to the next card on December 19, UFC Fight Night: Thompson vs. Neal.

Lungiambula was expected to face UFC newcomer Isi Fitikefu at UFC on ESPN 20 on January 20, 2021  However, Fitikefu was removed due to an elbow injury and replaced by Markus Perez. He won the fight via unanimous decision.

Lungiambula faced Marc-André Barriault on September 4, 2021 at UFC Fight Night 191. He lost the fight via unanimous decision.

Lungiambula faced Cody Brundage on  March 12, 2022 at UFC Fight Night 203. He lost the fight via guillotine choke submission in round one.

Lungiambula faced Punahele Soriano on July 16, 2022 at UFC on ABC 3. He lost the fight via knockout in the second round.

Lungiambula faced Edmen Shahbazyan on December 10, 2022, at UFC 282. He lost the fight via technical knockout in round two.

After the loss to Shahbazyan, Lungiambula was released from the UFC.

Championships and accomplishments

Mixed martial arts
Extreme Fighting Championship (EFC)
EFC Worldwide Light Heavyweight Championship
2 successful title defenses
EFC Worldwide Heavyweight Championship (One time)

Mixed martial arts record

|- 
|Loss
|align=center|11–6
|Edmen Shahbazyan
|TKO (punches)
|UFC 282
|
|align=center|2
|align=center|4:41
|Las Vegas, Nevada, United States
|
|-
|Loss
|align=center|11–5
|Punahele Soriano
|KO (punches)
|UFC on ABC: Ortega vs. Rodríguez
|
|align=center|2
|align=center|0:28
|Elmont, New York, United States
|
|-
|Loss
|align=center|11–4
|Cody Brundage
|Submission (guillotine choke)	
|UFC Fight Night: Santos vs. Ankalaev
|
|align=center|1
|align=center|3:41
|Las Vegas, Nevada, United States
|
|-
|Loss
|align=center|11–3
|Marc-André Barriault
|Decision (unanimous)
|UFC Fight Night: Brunson vs. Till 
|
|align=center|3
|align=center|5:00
|Las Vegas, Nevada, United States
|
|-
| Win
| align=center|11–2
| Markus Perez
| Decision (unanimous)
| UFC on ESPN: Chiesa vs. Magny
| 
| align=center|3
| align=center|5:00
| Abu Dhabi, United Arab Emirates
|
|-
| Loss
| align=center|10–2
| Magomed Ankalaev
|KO (front kick and punch)
|UFC Fight Night: Magomedsharipov vs. Kattar 
|
|align=center|3
|align=center|0:29
|Moscow, Russia
|
|-
| Win
| align=center|10–1
| Dequan Townsend
|TKO (punches and elbows)
|UFC on ESPN: Ngannou vs. dos Santos
|
|align=center|3
|align=center|0:42
|Minneapolis, Minnesota, United States
|
|-
| Win
| align=center|9–1
| Andrew van Zyl
| Decision (split)
| Extreme Fighting Championship 71
| 
| align=center|5
| align=center|5:00
| Johannesburg, South Africa
|
|-
| Win
| align=center|8–1
| Stuart Austin
|TKO (punches)
| Extreme Fighting Championship 65
|
|align=center|2
|align=center|1:48
|Johannesburg, South Africa
|
|-
| Win
| align=center|7–1
| Alan Baudot
|KO (punch)
| Extreme Fighting Championship 61
| 
| align=center|1
| align=center|0:26
| North West Province, South Africa
|
|-
| Win
| align=center| 6–1
| Tumelo Maphutha
| Decision (unanimous)
| Extreme Fighting Championship 52
| 
| align=center|5
| align=center|5:00
| Cape Town, South Africa
|  
|-
| Win
| align=center| 5–1
|Gideon Drotschie
| TKO (submission to punches)
| Extreme Fighting Championship 45
|
|align=Center|4
|align=center|1:10
|Cape Town, South Africa
| 
|-
| Loss
| align=center| 4–1
| Norman Wessels
| Submission (rear-naked choke)
| Extreme Fighting Championship 42
| 
| align=center| 2
| align=center| 1:45
| Cape Town, South Africa
| 
|-
| Win
| align=center| 4–0
| Yannick Bahati
| Decision (unanimous)
| Extreme Fighting Championship 39
| 
| align=center| 3
| align=center| 5:00
|Cape Town, South Africa
| 
|-
| Win
| align=center| 3–0
| Danie van Heerden
| Decision (unanimous)
| Extreme Fighting Championship 35
| 
| align=center| 3
| align=center| 5:00
| Cape Town, South Africa
| 
|-
| Win
| align=center| 2–0
| Pete Motaung
| Submission (armbar)
| Extreme Fighting Championship 34
| 
| align=center| 1
| align=center| 3:51
| Johannesburg, South Africa
|
|-
| Win
| align=center| 1–0
| Roelof Scheepers
| TKO (verbal submission)
| Extreme Fighting Championship 30
| 
| align=center| 1
| align=center| 0:59
| Cape Town, South Africa
|

See also 
 List of male mixed martial artists

References

External links 
  
 
 
 

1985 births
Living people
Democratic Republic of the Congo male mixed martial artists
Democratic Republic of the Congo male judoka
Democratic Republic of the Congo practitioners of Brazilian jiu-jitsu
Mixed martial artists utilizing judo
Mixed martial artists utilizing Brazilian jiu-jitsu
Middleweight mixed martial artists
Light heavyweight mixed martial artists
Ultimate Fighting Championship male fighters
Sportspeople from Kinshasa
21st-century Democratic Republic of the Congo people